Johnsville was a station on the Reading Company's New Hope Branch.  The station is currently on the line used by the New Hope and Ivyland Railroad.  Per the source, there are no remnants of this station surviving today.  A photo exists showing a shelter.

References

Former Reading Company stations
Former railway stations in Bucks County, Pennsylvania
Railway stations in the United States opened in 1891